Ajax Peak is a  mountain summit located in San Miguel County of southwest Colorado, United States. It is situated on land managed by Uncompahgre National Forest, and is the iconic landmark visible three miles east of the community of Telluride. Ajax is set immediately south of Savage Basin and the ghost town of Tomboy, one mile southwest of Chicago Peak, and one mile west of Telluride Peak. It is also immediately northeast of Bridal Veil Falls, Colorado's highest waterfall at 365-feet high. It is part of the San Juan Mountains which are a subset of the Rocky Mountains. The old mill town of Pandora at the base of Ajax Peak was hit by snow slides each winter, and one particularly bad event in 1884 came over the Ajax Mine and wrecked the mills.

Climate 
According to the Köppen climate classification system, Ajax Peak has an alpine subarctic climatewith cold, snowy winters, and cool to warm summers. Due to its altitude, it receives precipitation all year, as snow in winter, and as thunderstorms in summer, with a dry period in late spring. Precipitation runoff from the mountain drains into tributaries and headwaters of the San Miguel River.

Gallery

See also

References

External links 
 Ajax Peak trail: US Forest Service
 Weather forecast: Ajax Peak
 Ajax summit view: YouTube

Mountains of San Miguel County, Colorado
San Juan Mountains (Colorado)
Mountains of Colorado
North American 3000 m summits
Uncompahgre National Forest